Río Cuarto is a canton in the Alajuela province of Costa Rica. The head city is in Río Cuarto district.

Toponymy
Translates to Fourth River.

History 
Río Cuarto was created on 20 April 2018 by decree 9440.

It was originally a district of Grecia, however not on contiguous land as it was separated from Grecia when Sarchí canton, which was also part of Grecia originally, became a canton in 1949. After agreement of the Legislative Assembly of Costa Rica in second debate the Thursday 30 March 2017, Río Cuarto district became a canton, then in 2018 three districts were created in the canton.

Geography 
Río Cuarto has an area of  km² and a mean elevation of  metres.

It is located to the north of the Poás Volcano. It limits to the north and the west with the canton of San Carlos, to the east and also to the north with the canton of Sarapiquí to the south with the cantons of Alajuela and Zarcero.

The vegetation overflows with green, multicolored flowers, fruits and trees. The fauna is composed of dozens of species, some with animals as striking as the caribbean monkeys, sloths, and birds of all tones.

The type of vegetation is typical of the Humid Tropical Forest, characterized by the presence of trees up to 40 meters in height, ferns, epiphytic plants and mosses. The area also has abundant fruit plantations, ornamental and medicinal plants.

Area 
The canton has an area of 254.20 km² and is located between 10°24'44" north latitude and 84°12'56" west longitude.

Dimensions 
It has a maximum width of 38 km and is delimited by the rivers Toro and Caño Negro, and the massif of the Congo Volcano.

Its territory has an elongated form that extends from northeast to southwest.

Altitude 
The territory has an altitude of between 100 and 1800 meters above sea level.

It presents these great variations of altitude, since in the south zone of the canton are the foothills of the central volcanic mountain range (reaching its maximum point in the already mentioned Congo Volcano), whereas in north direction the land descends until its lowest point in the surroundings of the town of San Rafael.

Climate 
Its climate is temperate humid, between 16 °C to 28 °C, depending on the locality.

Geology 
It has materials of volcanic origin of the Quaternary period. Also predominant are Pleistocene rocks, as well as lahar is, recent and present volcanic buildings, and Holocene pyroclastics. The presence of this large amount of volcanic material explains the fertility of the soils of the canton.

Geomorphology 
The main volcanic massif is the Poás Volcano in the south, to which belong other subunits such as the Congo Volcano, the Hule Caldera (which forms the Lake Congo and Lake Hule) and the maar that forms Lake Río Cuarto.

Hydrography 
The water resource in the area is also abundant; proof of this is the presence of high waterfalls, lakes, rivers and frequent falls. And the weather is cool and pleasant, although a bit rainy at this time of year.

The main rivers are the Toro, Río Cuarto, Sardinal, María Aguilar and Caño Negro rivers. The Caño Negro, Pozo Azul and Quebrada Gata rivers are tributaries of the Toro River. All these rivers discharge their waters in the Sarapiquí River, that takes them to the San Juan River.

Districts 
The canton of Río Cuarto is subdivided into the following districts:
 Río Cuarto
 Santa Rita
 Santa Isabel

Demographics 

For the 2011 census, Río Cuarto district had a population of  inhabitants, as the population of the district became that of the canton, the historical population details are equivalent since 1927.

Transportation

Road transportation 
The canton is covered by the following road routes:

Economy 
Produce, milk, beef, pork, chicken meat, pineapple, cassava, electric power, ornamental plants, among others.

References 

Cantons of Alajuela Province
Populated places in Alajuela Province